WYLR is a radio station in the Youngstown, Ohio market. Licensed to Hubbard, the station broadcasts a contemporary Christian music (CCM) format on 101.9 FM from the Educational Media Foundation 24-hour national feed (K-LOVE).

The station signed on as a result of a construction permit issued on January 31, 1992 by Columbus atty. Percey Squire and local broadcaster Mr. Frankie 'Lucky" Halfacre who was the first African-American DJ in the greater Youngstown area who got his start on WNIO-1540 in the 1960s.

From 1998 until 2001, the station was operated by Jacor Communications and successor Clear Channel Communications via an LMA, making it a part of their extensive Youngstown/New Castle cluster of stations. The call letters were WBTJ, and sported a rhythmic top 40 format as "101.9 The Beat." Then-owner Stop 26/Riverbend took Clear Channel to court, complaining to the FCC that Clear Channel refused to preempt any of their programming upon Stop 26's request.

After settling in court, where Clear Channel paid a $25,000 fine to Stop 26 for unauthorized transfer of control of WBTJ, the "Beat" format was moved to the Sharpsville, PA-licensed 95.9 facility (where it became "Kiss FM" WAKZ), and WNIO's adult standards programming was briefly simulcast until Stop 26 could re-assume control of the station. When that happened, the WRBP call letters, which were used prior to Jacor/Clear Channel's LMA, were revived.

Stop 26/Riverbend declared bankruptcy in 2006, and Bernard Radio purchased almost all of their stations, including WRBP, WASN and WGFT.

The sale of Jamz 101.9

On June 13, 2012, it was announced by radioinsight that EMF Broadcasting will soon expand its Christian AC “K-Love” to 101.9. The company has acquired WRBP Hubbard from Bernard Radio for $500,000. It was confirmed by the FCC on the same day. The FCC link is below. The last day for the urban format was December 31, 2012, at which time the station began to feature the K-LOVE contemporary Christian format. As a result of the sale, the station became a non-commercial license. On January 24, 2013, the call letters were changed to WYLR.

External links
K-Love website
Valley 24.com Jamz 101.9 sold; to get Christian format

FCC filing of WRBP purchase

YLR
K-Love radio stations
Radio stations established in 1994
1994 establishments in Ohio
Educational Media Foundation radio stations
YLR